Eazhaiyin Sirippil is a 2000 Indian Tamil-language drama film directed by K. Subhash and written by P. Kalaimani. The film stars Prabhu Deva, Roja, Kausalya, and Suvalakshmi, while Indu, Vivek, Nassar, and Ranjith play supporting roles. The music was composed by Deva with cinematography by Ilavarasu and editing by Laxmi Raju. The film was released on 4 February 2000.

Plot 

Ganesh (Prabhu Deva) has the job of collecting travelers for the lone bus run by Padmavathi Bus Service in the town of Cuddalore. His high-energy people-gathering tactics are considered the reason for the crowds on the bus, and he earns commission for the same from the owner (Nassar) of the bus service. Though Ganesh earns quite enough, he does not buy new things and eats very late and little. No one knows why he is saving so much money. The bus owner was, a young cleaner at Venkatesa bus service, but he fell in love with the owner's daughter and eloped with her. Then after much hardships, he becomes the owner of four buses and very rich, in the same town, while his father in-law's bus company failing. He and his family still maintain no contact with the mother's family.

Ganesh is pursued by lottery ticket seller Saroja (Roja), who dreams of marrying him, though she receives no response from him. A final-year medical student named Kousalya (Kausalya), the daughter of Ganesh's boss, slowly falls for him after seeing his good-heartedness. One day, the bus owner's father-in-law falls very sick, and after much reluctance, he and his wife go to see him. The old man proposes a marriage between Kausalya and his other grandson, to which the bus owner says that he needs two days to decide. That evening, Kousalya is mistakenly locked in her class, and the owner beats Ganesh upon believing that the duo eloped. Though the owner apologizes, Ganesh is heartbroken.

Later, Kausalya visits a small suburban area colony for the vaccination campaign, where she is shocked when she sees Ganesh being accused by a mentally ill woman named Thulasi (Suvalakshmi), as being responsible for destroying her life and killing her brother.

Kausalya finds that three years ago, Thulasi's family moved to Cuddalore. However, Thulasi came two days later and was lost in the bus stand as her brother did not come to pick her up. Ganesh saw her and left in her in the area police station for safety at night. There, she is brutally raped by the Inspector. Thulasi berates Ganesh and comes home. She attempts suicide by poison; however, she is saved but loses her mental stability. Her brother, unable to bear her pain, commits suicide, leaving his pregnant wife.

Later, Ganesh saves enough money to treat her, and Thulasi is back to normal. Kausalya finds out that Ganesh has organized a marriage and rushes to save her love. She imagines whether Ganesh will marry her, Roja, or Thulasi. However, it is seen that the wedding is for Thulasi, and that Inspector has changed into a good man. When Thulasi's sister-in-law is unable to perform rites as she is a widow, Ganesh marries her, and then the duo performs the rites for Thulasi as brother and sister-in-law.

Later, the bus owner gifts Ganesh a brand new bus and tells him that he is also an owner, to which Ganesh replies that he is still a worker in heart.

Cast 

Prabhu Deva as Ganesan
Kausalya as Kausalya
Roja as Saroja
Suvalakshmi as Thulasi
Indu as Thulasi's sister-in-law
Vivek as Arasu
Ranjith as Doctor
Nassar as Bus Owner
Pandu as P. Pandu
Anu Mohan as Bus Driver
LIC Narasimhan as Police Officer
Raj Kapoor as Police Sub-Inspector
Poovilangu Mohan as Thulasi's brother
Mayilsamy as Bus Customer
Kaka Radhakrishnan as Bus owner
Mohan Raman
Japan Kumar (special appearance in the song "Yeppa Yeppa Aiyyappa")

Soundtrack 

The Music was composed by Deva.

Release 

The film was later dubbed and released in Telugu as Kirayi Kittigaadu, financed by G, Aruna Kumari.

The film was remade in Telugu as Navvuthu Bathakalira with J. D. Chakravarthy.

Soon after the release of the film, Prabhu Deva and Roja worked on another film title Kalavum Katru Mara directed by Mohanji. Despite completing shoot, the film did not have a theatrical release.

References

External links 
 

2000 films
2000s Tamil-language films
Films directed by K. Subash
Films scored by Deva (composer)
Indian drama films
Tamil films remade in other languages